Opornica is a small Serbian village in the metropolitan region of Kragujevac, in the municipality of Aerodrom. It is located on the Kragujevac-Topola road, which is the principal route to Belgrade.

The settlement was founded in 1815.

In the 2002 census the population of Opornica was 452. (In the census of 1991, 606 inhabitants were recorded). The village consists of 3 divisions: Forest Paradise, Rivers and Majnića.  Arable land is 237.57 ha; 29.75 ha of orchards; vineyards, 5.61 ha; 12.79 ha of meadows: pastures, 14.89 hectares, while the remaining land occupies 1.55 hectares.

Demographics
The average age is 40.1 years (38.8 for men and 41.5 for women). The village has 131 households, with the average number of 3.45 persons per household. According to the census of 2002, this village is highly inhabited by persons of Serbian descent.

Populated places in Šumadija District